Karkhaneh-ye Raisiyan (also Romanized as Kārkhāneh-ye Ra’īsīyān) is a village in Amlash-e Shomali Rural District, in the Central District of Amlash County, Gilan Province, Iran. At the 2006 census, its population was 46, in 13 families.

References 

Populated places in Amlash County